Peanut Butter Wolf's Jukebox 45's is a compilation album of Stones Throw Records, an American hip hop label.   Most of the album is performed or produced by Madlib, though other Stones Throw artists have songs also.

Track listing
 "Chops & Thangs"
 Performed by Beat Konducta
 "Microphone Mathematics [Remix]"
 Performed by Quasimoto
 "Flowers"
 Performed by Dudley Perkins
 "Things Could Be Better"
 Performed by Ernie & The Top Notes
 Featuring Raymond Winnfield
 "Harlem River Drive Interlude"
 Performed by Yesterdays New Quintet
 "I Am Singing"
 Performed by Yesterdays New Quintet
 "My 2600"
 Performed by Capt. Funkaho
 "Breaks Of Meditate"
 Performed by Beat Conductor
 "The Ox (Fantastic Four)"
 Performed by Madlib Invazion
 Featuring Medaphoar, Oh No
 "Rocket Ship"
 Performed by Stark Reality
 "Place Your Bet"
 Performed by Medaphoar
 "Poppin' Popcorn"
 Performed by The Highlighters Band
 "Getcho Soul Togetha (Part Two)"
 Performed by Breakestra
 "Devotion '92"
 Performed by Charizma
 "Conducted Rhythms"
 Performed by Beat Conductor
 "Enter Ralph Wiggum"
 Performed by A-Trak
 "Take Me"
 Performed by Fabulous Souls
 "Color"
 Performed by L.A. Carnival
 "Lost Lust"
 Performed by Beat Conductor
 "Mystic Brew Interlude"
 Performed by Yesterdays New Quintet
 "Knucklehead"
 Performed by Yesterdays New Quintet
 "On Point"
 Performed by Lootpack

Record label compilation albums
Madlib albums
Hip hop compilation albums
2002 compilation albums
Stones Throw Records compilation albums
Funk compilation albums